Dorothy Rockwell "Dot" Burnley (February 27, 1927 – April 19, 2016)  was an American businesswoman and politician.

Born in High Point, North Carolina, Burnley graduated from Jefferson High School in Roanoke, Virginia. She went to Hollins College from 1944 to 1946. Burnley was in the furniture business. From 1981 to 1985, Burnley served in the North Carolina House of Representatives and was a Republican. Burnley died in Kingston, New York where she had been living with her family for fifteen years.

Notes

1927 births
2016 deaths
People from High Point, North Carolina
Politicians from Kingston, New York
Politicians from Roanoke, Virginia
Hollins University alumni
Businesspeople from North Carolina
Women state legislators in North Carolina
Republican Party members of the North Carolina House of Representatives
20th-century American businesspeople
20th-century American women
21st-century American women